Kamran Nazirli (born 19 June 1958) is an Azerbaijani writer, dramatist and translator. He is a member of the Azerbaijani and Belarus Writers' Union and Journalists' Union of Azerbaijan. He was awarded with the Prize of H.B. Zardabi, the founder of the Azerbaijani National Press, Rasul Rza Prize for literature.

Life 
Nazirli was born in Astara in 1958 and moved to Baku in 1975, where he studied in the English faculty at the Azerbaijani Institute of Foreign Languages. He received his PhD with a thesis in Linguistics. He also graduated from the Baku Institute of Social Management and Politics and worked as a correspondent in various newspapers and State Information Agencies (Azerinform) as a translator in various international companies and projects financed by the World Bank. He is a Member of the Azerbaijani Writers' Union and the author of several books such as Love Story, Among the Natives, The Devil's Light, Selected Stories, The White House, and A Man in Coma.

He received the "Gold Word" prize from the Azerbaijani Ministry of Culture and Tourism in 2011 for his translation of the book entitled Nobody Ever Dies and was awarded a special prize from the USA Embassy in Azerbaijan for his translation book Moby Dick by Herman Melville and international Prize named after Rasul Rza for literature.

Kamran Nazirli has translated works by English and American novelists and poets into Azeri such as Jack London, Oscar Wilde, William Faulkner, Ernest Hemingway, Margaret Mitchell, Edgar Allan Poe, John Galsworthy, Somerset Maugham, Harold Pinter, etc. He also translates works by Azerbaijani writers and poets into English.

Works 
 Love Story (Baku, 1991)
 Among The Natives (Baku, 1995)
 The Old Baby (Baku, 2002)
 The Devil"s Light (Baku, 2004)
 Araz- My Life (Baku, 2004)
 A Man in Coma (Baku, 2007)
 Selected Stories (Baku, 2010)
 The White House (Baku, 2011)
 Tokay and Manana (Baku, 2012)
 Society Is the Mirror of Policy (Baku, 1999)
 Tell Me A Tale, Grandma!(Baku, 2003)
 The Moments of Noble Man"s Life (Baku, 2005)
 The Patrimony. Stories. Plays. Baku. 2014. 432 p.
 "19+1". Stories. Play. İn Russian. Baku, 2014. 360 p.
 The Book about Sohrab Tahir, Baku, Mutarjim, 2015
 The Book about Rashad Mahmudov, Baku, Mutarjim, 2015
 The Fourth Seal, Novel. Baku, Mutarjim, 2015. 464 p.
 The Happy Birds, Short Stories. Baku, Mutarjim, 2018. 196 p.
 When the Gull Build Nests. Short stories, Mutarjim, Baku, 2018, 248 p. 
 The Grandparents Don"t Say Fairytale, Short Stories. Baku, Mutarjim, 2018. 198 p.

Plays 
 The Devil"Light, The play was staged by Lankaran State Theatre in 2011.
 The Drug-addict, The play was staged by Sumgait State Theatre in 2014

Translated Books 
 Jack London, Novels and stories, Baku, 1987
 Nobody Ever Dies, Selection novels and stories of the World Literature, Baku, 2010
 Herman Melville, Moby Dick, Baku, 2011
 Oscar Wilde, Selected Works, Baku, 2012
 Novruz Najafoglu. Nijat, Tural and Humay: Stories. (Baku, 2013)
 Husseinbala Miralamov, Gates of Ganja, Historical novel with two parts, (Baku, 2013)
 Vaqif Bahmanli, Muslim (Baku, 2013)
 Mirafsal Tabib, Sonnets, Mutajim (Baku, 2012)
 Jabir Novruz, Selected poems, Mutajim (Baku, 2014)
 Candles (Anthology of the Azerbaijani poetry-101 verses of Azerbaijani poets), Baku, 2015, in English
 Punishment (novel by Azerbaijani writer H. Miralamov), Baku, 2015, in English
 Ales Karlyukevich. The adventures of Maksimka in homeland and other countries. Novel-story, Baku, Mutarjim, 2015. p. 116
 Svetlana Aleksievich. U voyni ne jenskoe licho. Novel on War. Baku, 2015
 Margaret Mitchell, Gone with the Wind, Novel, Baku, 2015
 Dawn. A Collection of poems. Gulu Aghsas. Contemporary Azerbaijani Poetry in English. Mutarjim Publishing House, 2016
 The Song of Spring. A Collection of poems. Nigar Rafibayli. Contemporary Azerbaijani Poetry in English. Mutarjim Publishing House, 2016
 The Unforgettable Letter. A Collection of poems. Baloglan Jalil. Contemporary Azerbaijani Poetry in English. Mutarjim Publishing House, 2016
 Nikolay Cherqinech. Sons. Novel, Baku, 2016
 You Love Me. A Collection of poems. Rashad Majid. Contemporary Azerbaijani Poetry in English. Mutarjim Publishing House, 2017
 A Light in the Darkness. A Collection of poems. Mehmet Nuri Parmaksiz Contemporary Turkish Poetry in English. Mutarjim Publishing House, Baku, 2017
 The Woman. A Collection of poems. Aysel A. Alizada. Contemporary Azerbaijani Poetry in English. Mutarjim Publishing House, Baku, 2017
 The Smell of Snow. A Collection of poems. Sona Valiyeva. Contemporary Azerbaijani Poetry in English. Zardabi LTD MMC Publishing House, Baku, 2018
 The Way to Love. A Collection of poems. Musa Urud. Contemporary Azerbaijani Poetry in English. Mutarjim Publishing House, Baku, 2019
 Stay in My Heart. A Collection of poems. Nazim Ahmadli. Contemporary Azerbaijani Poetry in English. Mutarjim Publishing House, Baku, 2021
 You are Your Own Way. A Collection of poems. Ramiz Rovshan. Contemporary Azerbaijani Poetry in English. Mutarjim Publishing House, Baku, 2021
 The Scent of Roses. Short stories. Zemfira Maharramli Contemporary Azerbaijani Prose in English. Mutarjim Publishing House, Baku, 2022

Awards 
H.B. Zardabi prize, 1999
Golden Word literature prize by Ministry of Culture for the translation book Nobody Ever Dies, 2011
Rasul Rza International literature prize, 2016, Baku
International literature prize "Rodnoy Dom", 2016, Minsk, Belarus

References

Azerbaijani writers
Azerbaijan University of Languages alumni
1958 births
Living people